Reuth is a village and a former municipality in the Vogtlandkreis district, in Saxony, Germany. Since 1 January 2017, it is part of the municipality Weischlitz.

References 

Former municipalities in Saxony
Weischlitz